James or Jim Byrne may refer to:

Politics
 James A. Byrne (1906–1980), U.S. Representative from Pennsylvania
 James Allen Byrne (1911–1975), Liberal Party member of the Canadian House of Commons

Religion
 James Byrne (Bishop of Toowoomba) (1870–1938), Irish-born priest
 James Byrne (bishop) (1908–1996), Roman Catholic prelate who served as archbishop of Dubuque and bishop of Boise
 James Byrne (Dean of Clonfert) (1820–1897), Church of Ireland priest

Sports

 James Byrne (footballer) (born 1978), Australian rules footballer
 James Byrne (sailor) (born 1948), Australian Olympic sailor
 J. F. Byrne (1871–1954), English cricketer; captain of Warwickshire and rugby international
 Jim Byrne (footballer, born 1880) (1880–1927), Australian rules footballer for Melbourne
 Jim Byrne (footballer, born 1933), Australian rules footballer for St Kilda
 Jim Byrne (Gaelic footballer) (1890–?), Irish Gaelic football administrator, referee and player

Other

 James Byrne (Irish criminal), Irish criminal
 James Byrne (lawyer) (born 1965), American lawyer
 James Byrne (musician) (1946–2008), Irish traditional musician
 James Byrne (poet) (born 1977), British poet and editor
 James Byrne (VC) (1822–1872), Irish recipient of the Victoria Cross
 James Byrne (fl. 1775–1819) of Clone, County Wexford, see List of monumental masons

See also
 James Burns (disambiguation)
 James Byrnes (disambiguation)